Jasper Township, Iowa may refer to:

Jasper Township, Adams County, Iowa
Jasper Township, Carroll County, Iowa

See also 
 Jasper Township (disambiguation)

Iowa township disambiguation pages